Thomas Dougal "Tam" Paton (5 August 1938 – 8 April 2009) was a pop group manager, most notably of the Scottish boy band the Bay City Rollers.

Biography
Born in Prestonpans, Scotland, 
he was the son of a potato merchant. Paton initially drove a truck to aid the Bay City Rollers financially. He guided the band through to their period of success during the mid-1970s, nurturing their image of being the "boys next door". He was responsible for beginning a myth that the band members preferred drinking milk to alcohol, in order to cultivate a clean, innocent image. However, vocalist Les McKeown later said Paton introduced the band members to drugs. "When we got a wee bit tired, he'd give us amphetamines," McKeown recalled in 2005. "He'd keep us awake with speed, black bombers. You end up almost showing off to each other what stupid drugs you've taken."

In 1979, Paton was fired as manager, and subsequently developed a multi-million pound real estate business based in Edinburgh, Scotland.

In the late 1970s Paton managed the band Rosetta Stone, and had a romantic relationship with the guitarist Paul Lerwill, who later changed his name to Gregory Gray.

Paton was openly gay and was involved in a number of legal controversies which related to his sexuality. In 1982, he was convicted of gross indecency with two teenage boys aged 16 and 17, below what was then the legal age of consent of 21, and served one year of a three-year prison sentence. 

In later years, Paton suffered from poor health including two heart attacks and a stroke. He was arrested on child sexual abuse charges in January 2003, but was later cleared of all allegations. In April 2004, Paton was convicted of supplying cannabis and fined £200,000. In 2003, he was accused of trying to rape the Bay City Rollers guitarist, Pat McGlynn, in a hotel room in 1977. The police decided there was insufficient evidence for a prosecution.

Paton died of a suspected heart attack aged 70 at his Edinburgh home on 8 April 2009.

References

Bibliography
 Stambler, Irwin. Encyclopedia of Pop, Rock & Soul. 1974. St. Martin's Press, Inc. New York .

1938 births
2009 deaths
20th-century Scottish criminals
21st-century Scottish criminals
Bay City Rollers
Drug dealers
Gay businessmen
British LGBT businesspeople
Scottish gay men
People from Prestonpans
20th-century Scottish businesspeople
Scottish music managers
Scottish people convicted of drug offences